Ewing Scott (1897–1971) was an American writer, producer and director. He specialised in films that involved location filming.

Select Credits
Igloo (1932)
Untamed Fury (1947) 
Harpoon (1948)
Arctic Manhunt (1949)

References

External links
Ewing Scott at TCMDB
Ewing Scott at BFI
Ewing Scott at Letterbox DVD

American film producers
American film directors
1897 births
1971 deaths
20th-century American screenwriters